Magnia Urbica was the wife of Emperor Carinus. She was granted the honorifics Augusta, and Mater castrorum, senatus ac patriae, "Mother of the (Military) camp, Senate and Fatherland". She and Carinus may have been the parents of Nigrinian.

References

External links

Caran dynasty
3rd-century Roman empresses
Year of birth unknown
Year of death unknown
Augustae